Burdwan Municipal Girls' High School is one of the oldest schools in India, having been established on 26 August 1936 by the efforts of Bardhaman Municipal Authority. It is located in Kalibazar, near court compound Burdwan in the state of West Bengal.

Curriculum
This school is a higher secondary school (from class 1 to 12). The curriculum is the West Bengal Board of Secondary Education (until class 10) and West Bengal Council of Higher Secondary Education (Class 11 and 12).  The common curriculum is followed until class 10. In class 11 and 12, there are 2 streams: Science and Arts.

Extracurricular activities
The school has extracurricular activities for students including creative arts, singing, dancing and a range of sports.
Besides the annual sports events, the school has a basketball team that participates in the District level championships.

Ceremonies
The school celebrates its foundation day on 26 August. In 2011 the school observed its Platinum Jubilee along with an exhibition. A prize distribution ceremony is observed on 28 August every alternate year. Students of classes 5 to 12 may achieve several prizes for achievement in various subjects.

References 

Girls' schools in West Bengal
Primary schools in West Bengal
High schools and secondary schools in West Bengal
Schools in Purba Bardhaman district
Educational institutions established in 1936
1936 establishments in India